The National Football League All-Decade Teams are honorary teams named by members of the Pro Football Hall of Fame selection committee.  Members consist of players who have been part of the National Football League (NFL) since its inception in 1920.  The committee selects members for each team based on their most active decade.  The teams are then named according to the decade.  The teams years start in the 1920s and have continued in 2010 with the 2000s.

NFL All-Decade Teams include:
National Football League 1920s All-Decade Team
National Football League 1930s All-Decade Team
National Football League 1940s All-Decade Team
National Football League 1950s All-Decade Team
National Football League 1960s All-Decade Team
National Football League 1970s All-Decade Team
National Football League 1980s All-Decade Team
National Football League 1990s All-Decade Team
National Football League 2000s All-Decade Team
National Football League 2010s All-Decade Team

See also

American Football League All-Time Team
Sports Illustrated NFL All-Decade Team (2009)
NFL 50th Anniversary All-Time Team
NFL 75th Anniversary All-Time Team
NFL 100th Anniversary All-Time Team